Sportklub Schwadorf (more commonly known as SK Schwadorf) was an Austrian football club, based in Schwadorf. They were last playing in the First League. The club was known as Trenkwalder Sportklub Schwadorf for sponsorship reasons — Trenkwalder being the company of chairman Richard Trenkwalder. In 2008, the club merged with VfB Admira Wacker Mödling to become Trenkwalder Admira.

History
The club was founded as ASK Schwadorf in May 1936, and played its first game on 7 June of that year, against Fischamend, winning 4–3.

On 8 August 2005, ASK Schwadorf hosted Spanish club Real Madrid in a pre-season friendly. The visitors fielded a team that included former FIFA World Player of the Year, Zinedine Zidane, Raúl, David Beckham and Michael Owen, Ronaldo and Roberto Carlos. Real won 4–1, with the goals coming from Raúl, Ronaldo, Javier Portillo and Owen.

Similarly, the club welcomed English Premier League side Arsenal for a pre-season friendly on 31 July 2006. The visitors, whose line-up featured only a couple of familiar names, won 8–1.

The club won the Landesliga championship in 2005–06 by a margin of twelve points.

They went on to win the Austrian Regional League East in 2006–07, thus achieving promotion for the fifth time in six years. Of their 30 league games, they won 22, drew 6, and lost 2. They finished seven points ahead of second-placed Polizei Feuerwehr.

Between 2005 and 2007, their manager was Attila Sekerlioglu. Sekerlioglu was fired in August 2007, and replaced by Bernd Krauss.

Prior to the 2007–08 season, the club changed its name from ASK Schwadorf to SK Schwadorf. The following season, 2008–09, Richard Trenkwalder bought the team, relocated it to Südstadt, and merged it with VfB Admira Wacker Mödling to become Trenkwalder Admira. For the 2013–14 season they are playing in the Austrian Football Bundesliga.

Former coaches
 Georg Heu
 Vladimir Jugović
 Bernd Krauss
 Heinz Peischl
 Mario Posch
 Andreas Ogris
 Attila Sekerlioglu
 Franz Wohlfahrt

Records
The club's biggest victory took place on 22 April 1983, when they beat ASK Edelsthal 10–0. Their reserve team, ASK Schwadorf II, won 19–0 on the same day.

References

External links
 Official club site
Profile on Eufo.de
Site @ Fussball Online

Association football clubs established in 1936
Defunct football clubs in Austria
1936 establishments in Austria
2008 disestablishments in Austria
Association football clubs disestablished in 2008